Get Out is the first compilation album of remixed studio and live tracks by folk rock band Capercaillie originally issued in 1992 and rereleased in 1999 by Survival Records with five bonus tracks.  It was reissued in North America by Valley Entertainment in 2002 with new artwork.

Track listing
 "Waiting for the Wheel to Turn ('92 version)"
 "Pige Ruadh (The Brown Whiskey Jar) (live)"
 "Dean Cadalan Sàmhach/Servant to the Slave ('92 version)"
 "Silver Spear Reels (live)"
 "Outlaws (live)"
 "Coisich, A Rùin (Walk My Beloved) (live)"
 "Fear a' bhàta (My Boatman) (original version)"
 "Dr. MacPhails Trance ('92 version)"

Reissue bonus tracks
 "Distant Hill"
 "The Reel Northern Light"
 "Mo Bhean Chomuinn"
 "A Cur Nan Gobhar As A' Chreig (Herding the Goats from the Rocks)"
 "Shanbally Castle/Caberfeidh"

Credits
Karen Matheson - vocals
Charlie McKerron - Fiddle
John Saich - Bass, Guitar
Manus Lunny - Bouzouki, Guitar
Marc Duff - Whistles, Bodhran, Wind Synth)
Donald Shaw - Accordion, Keyboards
James Mackintosh - drums on tracks 2, 4, 5 and 6

External links
 Information about the album on Capercaillie's official website

References 

Capercaillie (band) albums
1992 albums
Scottish Gaelic music